× Doritaenopsis (abbreviated  Dtps. in the horticultural trade) was a genus of artificial hybrids first formally described in 1935 by André Guillaumin in the Archives du Muséum national d'histoire naturelle.

Cultivation
The inflorescences should not be cut, as they will produce new flowers on old inflorescences. These hybrids produce many flowers, that last well into summer, have sharp colours and often multiple spikes. The tradeoff is slightly smaller flowers.

References

External links

Orchid nothogenera
Aeridinae
Historically recognized angiosperm taxa